Oscar Denis Sánchez (born 2 October 1946, in Concepción) is a Paraguayan politician and former Vice President. He was elected in June 2012. Upon his election he was Senator in the Senate of Paraguay.

Information
Previously he was the governor of Concepción Department 1993–1998 and a member of the Chamber of Deputies 1998–2003. He is a chemist by profession.

2020 kidnapping 
Denis was kidnapped along with one of his employees, on 9 September 2020 near Concepción, not far from the site where the Paraguayan army had dismantled a Paraguayan People’s Army (EPP) training area a week before. On 11 September, it was officially revealed that this organization was responsible for the abductions. , Denis remains in captivity.

See also
List of kidnappings
List of people who disappeared

References

1946 births
2020s missing person cases
Authentic Radical Liberal Party politicians
Living people
Kidnapped politicians
Kidnappings in Paraguay
Members of the Senate of Paraguay
Members of the Chamber of Deputies of Paraguay
Missing person cases in Paraguay
Paraguayan chemists
Vice presidents of Paraguay